Latastia  boscai, also known commonly as the Eritrea longtail lizard or Bosca's long-tailed lizard, is a species of lizard in the family Lacertidae. The species is native to East Africa and the Horn of Africa. There are three recognized subspecies.

Etymology
The specific name, boscai, is in honor of Spanish herpetologist Eduardo Boscá y Casanoves. The subspecific name, burii, is in honor of British naturalist George Wyman Bury.

Geographic range
L. boscai is found in Djibouti, Eritrea, Ethiopia, and Somalia.

Habitat

Reproduction
L. boscai is oviparous.

Subspecies
The following three subspecies are recognized as being valid, including the nominotypical subspecies.
Latastia boscai arenicola 
Latastia boscai boscai 
Latastia boscai burii

References

Further reading
Bedriaga J (1884). "Die neue Lacertiden-Gattung Latastia und ihre Arten ( L. Doriai n. sp., var. Martensi m., Samharica Blanf. und Boscai n. sp.)". Annali del Museo Civico di Storia Naturale di Genova 20: 307–324. (Latastia boscai, new species, pp. 322–324). (in German).
Lanza B (1990). "Amphibians and reptiles of the Somali Democratic Republic: check list and biogeography". Biogeographia 14: 407–465. (Latastia boscai, p. 426).
Largen MJ, Spawls S (2010). Amphibians and Reptiles of Ethiopea and Eritrea. Frankfurt am Main: Edition Chimaira / Serpents Tale. 694 pp. . (Latastia boscai, p. 352).
Parker HW (1942). "The Lizards of British Somaliland". Bulletin of the Museum of Comparative Zoölogy at Harvard College 91: 1–101. (Latastia boscai arenicola, new subspecies, pp. 71–72).

Reptiles described in 1884
Latastia
Taxa named by Jacques von Bedriaga